Rockets is a 2004 album by Canadian record producer and songwriter Daniel Lanois that consists of a collection of unreleased demos, live and rehearsal tracks, and leftovers. It was created as a "renegade CD" to be sold only at gigs and on Daniel Lanois' website.

Track listing
"Power of One" - 3:43
"Sweet Soul Honey" - 4:13
"JJ Leaves L.A." - 3:30
"Sometimes" - 2:32
"Rockets" - 4:38
"Devil's Bed" - 2:11
"The Maker" - 5:35
"Panorama" - 4:15
"Stormy Sky" (with Emmylou Harris and Willie Nelson) - 2:42
"Space Kay" - 4:02

References

2005 compilation albums
Daniel Lanois albums
Albums produced by Daniel Lanois